Buraco das Araras can refer to:

Buraco das Araras (Goiás), Sinkhole located in Goiás, Brazil
Buraco das Araras (Mato Grosso do Sul), Sinkhole located in Mato Grosso do Sul, Brazil
Buraco das Araras Private Natural Heritage Reserve, protected area in Mato Grosso do Sul